Franklin Leonard is an American film executive best known for founding The Black List, a yearly publication featuring Hollywood's most popular unproduced screenplays.  After working as a development executive for Overbrook Entertainment and Universal Pictures, Leonard is currently an adviser to BoomGen Studios and Plympton. Leonard serves on the board of directors for Young Storytellers.

Career
After graduating magna cum laude from Harvard University in 2000 in Social Studies, Leonard began his career as the Communications Director for John Cranley's campaign for the United States House of Representatives in Ohio's first district.  He went on to work as a columnist for the Trinidad Guardian, an analyst for McKinsey & Company, and an assistant for Creative Artists Agency.

Beginning in 2004, Leonard worked as a development executive for John Goldwyn Productions, Appian Way Productions, and Mirage Entertainment.  While working at Appian Way in 2005, he came up with the concept behind "The Black List," forwarding a spreadsheet to seventy five fellow producers to collect the names of well-known but unproduced screenplays. After becoming an instant success, The Black List was adapted into a website and has provided over two hundred screenplays which later became feature films. 

Leonard went on to become one of the youngest executives at Universal Pictures, serving as Director of Development and Production. Two years later, he was Vice President of Creative Affairs at Will Smith's production company, Overbrook Entertainment.  Leonard shared the title with Smith's brother-in-law Caleeb Pinkett, and later left the company after two years.

Besides his full-time work on The Black List, Leonard is currently an adviser to Plympton, a literary studio that specializes in serialized fiction, and BoomGen Studios, where he assisted in developing the transmedia graphic novel 1001. He is also a Judge on the Afrinolly Short Film Competition; Africa's most prestigious Short Film Competition with a $25,000 first place cash prize to winners. He currently serves on the board of directors for Young Storytellers, an arts education nonprofit organization.

Franklin is also an executive producer of the film "Come as you Are", distributed by Samuel Goldwyn Films.

References

External links

Franklin Leonard interview with Scripts & Scribes.

American film producers
Living people
Harvard University alumni
African-American film producers
African-American businesspeople
Year of birth missing (living people)
21st-century African-American people
Vanity Fair (magazine) people